Guante blanco is a Spanish crime television series produced by Bambú Producciones that was originally broadcast by RTVE in 2008. The cast features José Luis García Pérez, Carlos Hipólito, José Ángel Egido, Eloy Azorín, Pilar Punzano, Jordi Dauder, Leticia Dolera, among others.

Premise 
The fiction tracks the standoff between Mario Pastor (a gentleman thief) and Bernardo Valle (a police officer hellbent on catching him), and their respective collaborators.

Cast

Production and release 
Shooting began by July 2008.

The first episode was pre-screened at the 56th San Sebastián International Film Festival in September 2008.

The series debuted in prime time on 15 October 2008, earning 2,489,000 average viewers and a 15.9% audience share. The next episodes earned respectively 1,851,000 viewers and a 9.9% audience share (22 October 2008) and 1,277,000 and a 8.0% audience share (31 October 2008). 
The original broadcasting run on linear television was axed due to poor ratings after the third episode, leaving five unaired episodes, which were made available on the online service rtve.es. Televisión Española decided to run the full series again in prime time in 2010.

References

External links 
 Guante blanco on RTVE Play

Spanish-language television shows
2000s Spanish drama television series
2008 Spanish television series debuts
2008 Spanish television series endings
Crime thriller television series
2000s crime television series
Spanish crime television series
La 1 (Spanish TV channel) network series
Television series by Bambú Producciones